Mercy College (Mercy or Mercy NY) is a private university with its main campus in Dobbs Ferry, New York, and additional locations in Manhattan, the Bronx, and Yorktown Heights. The university is historically affiliated with the Catholic church. Mercy College has five schools: Business, Education, Health & Natural Sciences, Liberal Arts and Social & Behavioral Sciences, and offers more than 90 undergraduate and graduate degree and certificate programs. The university had 11,295 students enrolled in fall 2015. The student body comes from 43 states and 54 countries.

History 

Founded by the Sisters of Mercy in 1950, Mercy College became a four-year college offering programs leading to the baccalaureate degree in 1961. The college was accredited by the Middle States Commission on Higher Education in 1968. In the next half-decade, Mercy College set a course for its future with a series of actions including declaring itself independent and co-educational. In addition, it doubled the size of the existing physical plant and initiated the first of many community outreach efforts. Mercy College in the 1970s broadened its outreach through the establishment of extension centers and branch campuses throughout communities in Westchester County and New York City.

Mercy College was authorized to offer its first graduate program, nursing, in 1981. Since then, over 30 diverse graduate programs have been introduced, and in 2006, the college was granted authorization to offer its first doctoral program in physical therapy. The college expanded its offerings to include online programs in the 1990s, and was soon granted the ability to offer entire degree programs online. Thousands of Mercy College students take one or all of their courses online through the more than 40 undergraduate and graduate programs offered.

In 2004, Timothy L. Hall, the former president of Austin Peay State University, as well as the former provost of University of Mississippi, became the 12th president of Mercy College.

In January 2017, founding dean of the College of Arts and Sciences and associate vice president for academic affairs at Western New Mexico University, as well as a former program director at the National Science Foundation (NSF), Dr. José Herrera, was appointed the new provost and vice president of academic affairs of Mercy College.

In early 2019, Mercy College and the College of New Rochelle announced that College of New Rochelle (CNR) would be absorbed into Mercy College before Fall 2019, including College of New Rochelle's students, faculty, programs, some facilities, as well as transcripts, history and legacy of CNR alumnae/i. Mercy College would become the repository of CNR documents.

In March 2019, the agreement between the College of New Rochelle and Mercy College was finalized.

On August 12, 2019, it was announced that William Latimer, the 14th and final College of New Rochelle president, will join Mercy College as vice president of its New Rochelle and Bronx locations.

Campuses

Dobbs Ferry main campus

The main campus is in Dobbs Ferry, New York, overlooking the Hudson River. In addition to academic and administrative buildings, it houses the college's residence and athletics buildings. In 2011, Mercy College bought the Our Lady of Victory Academy building after the school closed. Dobbs Ferry students enjoy all the nearby shopping and restaurants, just steps from campus, as well as biking, jogging, or walking along the Old Croton Aqueduct Trail that runs through campus. The Dobbs Ferry main campus is just a short walk from the Ardsley-on-Hudson Station of the Metro-North Hudson Line, making Grand Central Terminal in New York City accessible in less than 30 minutes. In December 2015, the college opened a new 350-bed, state-of-the-art residence hall complex that includes a 5,000-square-foot fitness center facility and student commons with shops.

Mercy College hosted the Third Round and Quarterfinals of the 2017 NCAA Division II Women's Soccer Championships at Mercy Field on the Dobbs Ferry main campus.

Sites

Manhattan
The Manhattan site is situated in the heart of Manhattan at Herald Square and occupies two floors at 66 W 35th St.

Bronx
The Bronx site occupies  at the Hutchinson Metro Center, a rapidly developing complex of corporate and health care organizations and businesses.

Yorktown Heights
In 1979, the Yorktown site of Mercy College was moved to its permanent facility at the intersection of Route 202 and Strang Boulevard. This beautifully landscaped building was renovated for college use. The branch library of Mercy College on Mercy College's Yorktown site has been designated a federal depository for government publications. In Yorktown Heights, students have access to Northern Westchester, Putnam, Rockland, Dutchess and Fairfield Counties. The site is close to Franklin Delano Roosevelt State Park, which offers extensive outdoor recreational activities.

Former College of New Rochelle campus lease
In fall 2019, Mercy leased the CNR’s main campus in New Rochelle for up to two years, at $1.8 million a year, and nearly 1,700 students from CNR became Mercy students. Mercy negotiated leases for three former CNR campuses including New Rochelle, Rosa Parks in Harlem and the Brooklyn Campus in the Bedford-Stuyvesant section of Brooklyn. However this arrangement proved shortl-ived as the College of New Rochelle main campus in New Rochelle was sold in December 2019 to the Grand Lodge of New York Freemasons in order to pay off the College of New Rochelle's debts. It has since been turned into a senior-living facility for aged and infirm Freemasons.

Academics

Schools
Mercy College has five schools: 
School of Business
School of Education
School of Health & Natural Sciences
School of Liberal Arts 
School of Social & Behavioral Sciences

Mercy College offers more than 90 undergraduate and graduate degree and certificate programs, including more than two dozen that can be completed online. The faculty comprises 210 full-time professors with a significant majority holding the highest degree in their respective fields, Fulbright Scholars, published and national best-selling authors, and experts.

Reputation and rankings
 124 in Regional Universities North by U.S. News & World Report in 2022.
 Mercy College tied for sixth place on the list for best “campus ethnic diversity” in the northern region by U.S. News & World Report in 2017.
 Barron's ranks Mercy College a "best buy" and "competitive" in college education.
 Mercy College was featured on Washington Monthly’s 2015 Best Bang for the Buck Rankings.

Admissions
Peterson's classed Mercy College's admissions process as "moderately difficult". Undergraduate acceptance rate was 66% in Fall 2015. The average high school GPA of incoming freshmen was 84.75/100 (3.4/4.0) in Fall 2015. Mercy College's School of Business had a 68% acceptance rate in 2017.

Demographics 
As of 2014, the undergraduate population includes 7,157 full-time and 2,942 part-time students with 31 percent of freshmen and 12 percent of all full-time undergraduates residing in campus-affiliated housing. While the majority of students are New York residents, students represent 43 states and 54 countries. Mercy College offers small class sizes with an average student/faculty ratio of 20:1. 88% of students are commuters; 12% live in campus housing. Mercy College has 71% female students and 29% male students.

Accreditation
All campuses of Mercy College are accredited by the Middle States Commission on Higher Education. Among others, Mercy College colleges and programs holds professional accreditations with:

 Accreditation Council for Occupational Therapy Education
 Accreditation Review Commission for Physician Assistant
 Accreditation Council for Business Schools & Programs 
 American Association for Paralegal Education
 American Association of Colleges of Nursing Mercy College
 American Physical Therapy Association
 American Speech, Language and Hearing Association
 American Veterinary Medical Association
 Commission on Accreditation in Physical Therapy Education
 Commission on Collegiate Nursing Education
 Council on Social Work Education
 Regents Accreditation of Teacher Education (In candidacy for NCATE accreditation, late 2013)

Libraries
Mercy College houses four university libraries. Branch libraries are present on all of Mercy's sites. Its main flagship library is on the Dobbs Ferry Campus. The library at Mercy's Yorktown site has been designated a federal depository for government publications.

Athletics 

Mercy athletic teams are the Mavericks. The college is a member of the Division II level of the National Collegiate Athletic Association (NCAA), primarily competing in the East Coast Conference (ECC; formerly known as the New York Collegiate Athletic Conference (NYCAC) until after the 2005–06 academic year) since the 1989–90 academic year.

Mercy College sponsors an intramural sports program, as well as intercollegiate competition in 10 varsity sports: Men's sports include baseball, basketball, lacrosse and soccer; while women's sports include basketball, field hockey, lacrosse, soccer, softball and volleyball.

The baseball, lacrosse, soccer, and field hockey teams, in addition to numerous local community high school and youth groups, play on a new, eco-friendly turf field on the Dobbs Ferry campus, overlooking the Hudson River.

Nickname 
In 2007, the college changed its athletic nickname from "Flyers" to "Mavericks" after the administration reviewed suggestions from students and faculty members.

Student life

Student government
The Mercy College Student Government Association (SGA) is responsible for protecting students’ rights, advocating for students’ interests, and promoting student life.

ROTC 
Mercy College has U.S. Army ROTC and U.S. Navy ROTC programs on campus.

Notable people

List of Presidents 

 Jay Sexter - 1990-1999

 Lucie Lapovsky - 1999-2004

 Louise Feroe - 2004-2008

 Kimberly Kline - 2008-2013

 Timothy Hall - 2014-2023

Notable faculty and staff

 Thomas J. Abinanti, American politician, lawyer, and member of the New York State Assembly from Greenburgh, New York.
 Fernando Cabrera, American politician in the Bronx, New York. A Democrat, he currently represents the 14th District in the New York City Council. Formerly program director for the Mental Health and Counseling program at Mercy College
 Hind Rassam Culhane, lawyer, social and behavioral scientist 
 Ira Joe Fisher, winner of two regional Emmys
 Emmanuel Gyimah Labi, Ghanaian composer, conductor, and music professor. 
 Adma d'Heurle, Distinguished Professor of Psychology, one of five original faculty members of the college 
 Matt Kilcullen, Director of Athletics
 Wilbert J. Le Melle, American diplomat, author and academician. Former President of Mercy College
 Joseph Thomas O'Keefe, American prelate of the Roman Catholic Church who served as Bishop of Syracuse from 1987 to 1995.
 Barbara Boucher Owens, American computer scientist 
 Victor M. Pichardo, a Democratic member of the New York State Assembly. Former associate director of Public Relations at Mercy College.
 Alfred S. Posamentier, American author and educator
 Judson Rosebush, director and producer of multimedia products and computer animation, an author, artist and media theorist.
 Arthur Rothstein, recognized as one of America's premier photojournalists. 
 Boria Sax, American author and lecturer
 Jay Sexter, former President of Mercy College
 Mark Skousen, American economist and writer.
 Rick Wolff, book editor, author, college coach, broadcaster, and former professional baseball player.

Notable alumni
Mercy College had more than 66,710 alumni as of 2019. Additionally, the now-defunct College of New Rochelle's alumni, numbering more than 50,000, have been merged into the Mercy College Family.

 Jamaal Bowman, American politician and educator serving as the U.S. representative for  since 2021. 
 Pasquale J. D'Amuro, American terrorism authority, former intelligence agent and television analyst. In a career of 26 years he rose to the third position of the FBI. 
 Oseadeeyo Kwasi Akuffo III, Ghanaian traditional ruler who is the Omanhene (or paramount chief) of the Akuapem traditional area (Okuapeman) in Ghana.
 Garvin Alston, retired American professional baseball right-handed pitcher who played in Major League Baseball (MLB) 
 Walter Anderson, former publisher and CEO of Parade Magazine
 Elaine Bartlett, activist
 Dewey Bozella, former amateur boxer 
 Paul Broadie, president of Housatonic Community College and Gateway Community College
 Robert Cornegy, New York City Council Member for the 36th District, representing Bedford-Stuyvesant and northern Crown Heights in Brooklyn.
 Laura Creavalle, professional female bodybuilder
 Jeffrey Mark Deskovic, man wrongly convicted of rape
 Rob DiToma, head baseball coach at Fairleigh Dickinson University. 
 Simone Forbes, Jamaican sportswoman, having represented Jamaica in no less than five sports
 Donna Hylton, Jamaican-American activist and murderer
 Stan Jefferson, former center and left fielder in Major League Baseball who played for the New York Mets among others
 Mike Kavekotora, Namibian politician and member of parliament. He is the president of the Rally for Democracy and Progress (RDP)
 Carolyn Kepcher, businesswoman who was one of the judges on the NBC television program The Apprentice.
 Leopoldo Minaya, poet
 Olivia Peguero, contemporary landscape and botanical artist
 David Rosado, American politician from New York
 Gabourey Sidibe, Academy Award-nominated actress
 Pamela Smart, American high school teacher
 Brian Sweeney, former MLB pitcher
 Sandra Uwiringiyimana, author
 Wesley Walker, former NFL wide receiver
 Gregory Howard Williams, 27th President of the University of Cincinnati, and the 11th President of the City College of New York.
 Mookie Wilson, former MLB outfielder/ coach.
 Joan Wolf, author of more than 15 historical novels.
 Mark Zuckerberg, self-made billionaire, chairman, chief executive officer, and co-founder of Facebook

See also
 BronxNet

References

Notes

Citations

Bibliography

External links

 
 Official athletics website

 
1950 establishments in New York (state)
Educational institutions established in 1950
Universities and colleges in Westchester County, New York
Yorktown, New York
Sisters of Mercy colleges and universities
Former women's universities and colleges in the United States
Liberal arts colleges in New York (state)
Universities and colleges in Manhattan
Greenburgh, New York
Private universities and colleges in New York (state)
Women in New York City